North Aceh Regency is a regency in Nanggroe Aceh Darussalam (Aceh Special District), in Indonesia. It is located on the island of Sumatra. The regency covers an area of 3,236.86 square kilometres and had a population of 534,085 at the 2010 census and 602,793 at the 2020 Census; the official estimate as at mid 2021 was 608,106. The administrative centre is now at Lhoksukon; this followed the separation in 2001 of the former capital of Lhokseumawe, which was cut out of the regency by Law No. 2 of 2001 on 21 June 2001 to form an independent city.

Economy 
This regency is included in one of the largest industrial regions outside Java, especially with the opening of liquid gas processing industry plants based on PT Arun LNG in Lhokseumawe, 1974. There were several large factories nearby at the time: PT.Kertas Kraft Aceh, pabrik Pupuk AAF (Aceh Asean Fertilizer) and pabrik Pupuk Iskandar Muda (PIM). The Port of Krueng Geukueh is located in the regency.

In the agricultural sector, the regency has a good reputation as an important rice producer.  The whole North Aceh Regency has the greatest potential of any region in Aceh and its income per capita is above Rp 1.4 million (without oil and natural gas) or Rp 6 million (with oil and natural gas).

Gas and petroleum fields were found in Lhokseumawe, North Aceh's former capital city around the 1970s. Then, many investors interested in its natural resources came to Aceh.  Since then, liquefied natural gas (LNG) processed in refinery of PT. Arun Natural Gas Liquefaction (NGL) Co, coming from the installation of PT. ExxonMobil Oil Indonesia (EMOI) in Lhokseumawe industrial zone (now : Arun Lhokseumawe Special Economic Zone), had changed this regency to modern petrochemistry industrial region.

There are 2 sectors dominating economical activity in North Aceh, i.e. mining and excavating, and processing industrial sector. In mining sector, the gas wells processed by PT. EMOI surely become one of this sector's pioneering factor.

Religion 
North Aceh's inhabitants are predominantly Muslim. Minorities still get the freedom to worship according to their respective religions.

Border 
 North: Malacca Strait
 East: East Aceh Regency
 South: Central Aceh Regency
 West: Bireuen Regency

Administrative districts 

The regency is divided administratively into twenty-seven districts (kecamatan), listed below with their areas and their populations at the 2010 Census and the 2020 Census, together with the official estimates as at mid 2021. The table also includes the locations of the district administrative centres, the number of administrative villages (gampong) within each district, and its post code.

Politics 
The current regent is Muhammad Thaib also known as Cek Mad.

References

External links 
  Official website